This is the discography of the British punk rock band The King Blues.

Studio albums

Singles

Extended plays

Music videos

References

Discographies of British artists
Punk rock discographies